Three-time defending champion Shingo Kunieda defeated Stefan Olsson in the final, 6–4, 6–0 to win the men's singles wheelchair tennis title at the 2010 French Open. It was his fourth French Open singles title and tenth major singles title overall.

Seeds
 Shingo Kunieda (champion)
 Stéphane Houdet (semifinals)

Draw

Finals

References
Main Draw

Wheelchair Men's Singles
French Open, 2010 Men's Singles